Ghost of Dragstrip Hollow is a 1959 AIP horror/comedy film. It was a sequel to their film Hot Rod Gang. American International Pictures released the film in July 1959 as a double feature with Diary of a High School Bride.

The film spoofed the 1950s monster and drag racing films of AIP, and has been regarded as a forerunner of the 1960s Beach Party films. Spoofs like this film helped bring a close to AIP's 1950s low-budget horror film genre. This was the last monster movie that special effects technician Paul Blaisdell worked on.

Plot
After being evicted from their old clubhouse, members of a Los Angeles drag racing club move into an old deserted mansion and set up shop, making it their new headquarters. For the club's grand opening, they hold a Halloween masked ball and invite everyone to come dressed as their favorite monster. The festivities take an unexpected turn when one of the youths discovers an imposter among them: a real live monster (AIP's oft-reused She-Creature costume, played by its real-life creator Paul Blaisdell), who has been mixing in with the kids, hogging all the dances with the best-looking girls. The phony monster is unmasked at the end of the film by one of the teenagers, revealing it to be AIP's special effects maestro Paul Blaisdell. 

Blaisdell cries like a little wimp (looking frail and tiny in the oversized costume) complaining into the camera: "You've seen me before. I scared you to death in The Day the World Ended. You shivered when you saw me in She-Creature (sniffle). Oh the shame of it, the indignity! They didn't use me in Horrors of the Black Museum after my years of faithful service (sob). They just.....threw me away!" (Then the kids chase him out of the house and continue partying.)  

The ironic thing is, Blaisdell never worked on another film after Dragstrip Hollow, making his comedic speech in the film seem sadly prophetic in hindsight. (Note*- Horrors of the Black Museum was made in the U.K., so AIP couldn't have used the Hollywood-based Blaisdell on that film even if they had wanted to.)

Cast
 Jody Fair as Lois Cavendish
 Russ Bender as Tom Hendry
 Henry McCann as Dave
 Martin Braddock as Stan
 Elaine DuPont as Rhonda
 Jack Ging as Tony
 Tommy Ivo as himself 
 Paul Blaisdell as man in Monster Suit

Production
Paul Blaisdell, AIP's top special effects technician from 1954-1959, was asked to spoof himself in the film, not realizing how close the film's ending would parallel the end of his own career a year or two later.

Home media
The film was released on DVD by MGM on February 15, 2005.

Reception

TV Guide panned the film, stating that "[the] deformed script could have only been helped by a complete rewrite". On his website Fantastic Movie Musings and Ramblings, Dave Sindelar criticized the film's "turgid pacing", lack of plot, and underdeveloped scenarios. Dennis Schwartz of Ozus' World Movie Reviews rated the film a grade D, writing, "A dreadful hot rod teen comedy for the drive-in crowd. This one stinks even for AIP."

See also
 List of American films of 1959
 Paul Blaisdell

References

External links
 

Soundtrack reviewed at Beach Party movies

1959 films
1950s comedy horror films
1959 horror films
American comedy horror films
American International Pictures films
1950s ghost films
Beach party films
American auto racing films
Films scored by Ronald Stein
Films set in abandoned houses
Films set in country houses
1959 comedy films
1950s English-language films
1950s American films